Eduards Tīdenbergs (born 18 December 1994) is a Latvian footballer who plays as a midfielder for FK Liepāja and the Latvia national team.

Career
Tīdenbergs made his international debut for Latvia on 7 October 2020 in a friendly match against Montenegro, which finished as a 1–1 away draw.

Career statistics

International

References

External links
 
 
 Eduards Tīdenbergs at Latvian Football Federation

1994 births
Living people
Latvian footballers
Latvia youth international footballers
Latvia under-21 international footballers
Latvia international footballers
Association football midfielders
FK Ventspils players
FK Liepāja players
Latvian Higher League players